Starnberg – Landsberg am Lech (English: Starnberg – Landsberg at the Lech) is an electoral constituency (German: Wahlkreis) represented in the Bundestag. It elects one member via first-past-the-post voting. Under the current constituency numbering system, it is designated as constituency 224. It is located in southwestern Bavaria, comprising the districts of Landsberg and Starnberg.

Starnberg – Landsberg am Lech was created for the 1980 federal election. Since 2017, it has been represented by Michael Kießling of the Christian Social Union (CSU).

Geography
Starnberg – Landsberg am Lech is located in southwestern Bavaria. As of the 2021 federal election, it comprises the districts of Landsberg and Starnberg as well as the municipality of Germering from the Fürstenfeldbruck district.

History
Starnberg – Landsberg am Lech was created in 1980, then known as Starnberg. It acquired its current name in the 2017 election. In the 1980 through 1998 elections, it was constituency 210 in the numbering system. In the 2002 and 2005 elections, it was number 225. Since the 2009 election, it has been number 224.

Originally, the constituency comprised the districts of Bad Tölz-Wolfratshausen, Miesbach, and Starnberg. In the 2005 and 2009 elections, it lost the municipality of Krailling from Starnberg district. In the 2013 election, it regained Krailling while losing the Gauting municipality. It acquired its current borders in the 2017 election.

Members
Like most constituencies in rural Bavaria, it is an CSU safe seat, the party holding the seat continuously since its creation. It was first represented by Franz-Ludwig Schenk Graf von Stauffenberg from 1980 to 1987, followed by Wolfgang Gröbl from 1987 to 1998. Ilse Aigner was then representative from 1998 to 2013. Alexander Radwan served one term from 2013 to 2017. Michael Kießling was elected in 2017.

Election results

2021 election

2017 election

2013 election

2009 election

References

Federal electoral districts in Bavaria
1980 establishments in West Germany
Constituencies established in 1980
Starnberg (district)
Landsberg (district)
Fürstenfeldbruck (district)